Emmanuel Rhoides (28 June 1836 – 7 January 1904) was a Greek writer and journalist.

Biography
Born in Hermoupolis, the capital of the island of Syros, to a family of rich aristocrats
from Chios — who had fled the island after the massacre of its population by the Ottomans in 1822 — he spent much of his youth abroad. Rhoides was erudite and at a young age had mastered not only the languages of continental Europe, but also ancient Greek and Latin.

His early youth years he spent in Genoa, Italy in the times of the Revolutions of 1848 in the Italian states and the revolt of Genoa. He studied history, literature and philosophy in Berlin, and later in Iași, Romania where his merchant father had transferred the centre of his business activities.

Obeying a parental wish, he moved to Athens, where he printed the translation of Chateaubriand's Itinéraires. In 1860, after a brief sojourn in Egypt, he decided to live and stay permanently in Athens.

Later in his life, he would become very poor, especially with the bankruptcy of the family business, and the subsequent suicide of his beloved brother Nicholas. He eked out his last years by working as a curator for the National Library of Greece. But, even from this position he was dismissed in 1902, when he got into a political dispute with the government.

Rhoides suffered all through his life from a serious hearing problem, which eventually impaired his sense to near deafness.

In 1866 Rhoides published a controversial novel, The Papess Joanne (Ἡ Πάπισσα Ἰωάννα), an exploration of the legend of Pope Joan, a supposed female pope who reigned some time in the ninth or tenth century (which was in fact a time of great turmoil for the papacy). Though a romantic novel with satirical overtones, Rhoides asserted it contained conclusive evidence that Pope Joan truly existed and that the Catholic Church had been attempting to cover up the fact for centuries. The novel was admired by Mark Twain and Alfred Jarry and freely translated by Lawrence Durrell as The Curious History of Pope Joan in 1954.

The book's scathing attacks on what he viewed as an uneducated, uncultured, superstitious and  backward clergy were controversial, and led to Rhoides's excommunication from the Greek Orthodox Church which perceived that its own clergy was the real target of those attacks.

Rhoides often adopted a clear-cut critical stance against the romanticism in literature and poetry and often was poignant and sarcastic to the romance writers and poets of his time. Rhoides, amongst his numerous translations, became the first to translate the works of Edgar Allan Poe into Greek. He wrote frequently in many newspapers and magazines, and published his own satirical newspaper called Asmodaios.

He has expressed the misogynistic view that "Two professions are fit for women: housewife and prostitute".

Quotes
"Each place suffers from something, England from fog, Romania from locusts, Egypt from eye diseases, and Greece from the Greeks." - Emmanuel Rhoides

References

Biography of Rhoides in Short Stories from Syros

Mavrelos N., Roidis’ tangible images and Baudelaire’s paintings of modern life. Aspects of Modernity in Emmanouíl Roidis’ works, Lambert Academic Publishing 2018.

External links
 

1836 births
1904 deaths
People from Ermoupoli
19th-century Greek writers
19th-century male writers
People excommunicated by the Greek Orthodox Church